Neocollyris aeneicollis is a species of ground beetle in the genus Neocollyris in the family Carabidae. It was described by Naviaux and Cassola in 2005.

References

Aeneicollis, Neocollyris
Beetles described in 2005